Frankétienne (born Franck Étienne on April 12, 1936, in Ravine-Sèche, Haiti) is a Haitian writer, poet, playwright, painter, musician, activist and intellectual. He is recognized as one of Haiti's leading writers and playwrights of both French and Haitian Creole, and is "known as the father of Haitian letters". As a painter, he is known for his colorful abstract works, often emphasizing the colors blue and red. He was a candidate for the Nobel Prize in Literature in 2009, made a Commander of the Ordre des Arts et Lettres (Order of the Arts and Letters), and was named UNESCO Artist for Peace in 2010.

Early life
Frankétienne was born in Ravine-Sèche, a small village in Haiti. He was abandoned by his father, a rich American industrialist, at a young age and was raised by his mother in the Bel Air neighborhood of Port-au-Prince, where she was a respected entrepreneur, owning her own business to support her eight children, managing to send him, who was the eldest, to school.

Selected works
 
 Au Fil du Temps, a compilation of poems
 Ultravocal, a novel
 Pèlin Tèt, a play written in Haitian Creole
 Dézafi, a novel about life during under the Duvalier regime, the first ever in Haitian Creole
 Mûr à Crever, a novel
 Les Affres d'un Défi, a novel
 Désastre (12 janvier 2010), painting
 Difficile émergence vers la lumière, painting

References

External links
Frankétienne  author profile on Prince Claus Foundation site
Île en île: Frankétienne author file (in French), with biography, bibliography, and audio

Further reading
 
 
 
 
 Jonassaint, Jean. "Frankétienne, Écrivain haïtien," Dérives 53/54 (1987)
 
 
 

1936 births
Haitian Creole-language writers
Haitian people of American descent
Haitian people of Mulatto descent
20th-century Haitian dramatists and playwrights
Haitian male dramatists and playwrights
Haitian male novelists
Haitian artists
Haitian painters
Haitian male painters
Haitian male poets
Living people
20th-century Haitian poets
20th-century Haitian novelists
21st-century Haitian poets
21st-century Haitian novelists
20th-century male writers
21st-century male writers